Sodium- and chloride-dependent betaine transporter, also known as Na(+)/Cl(-) betaine/GABA transporter (BGT-1), is a protein that in humans is encoded by the SLC6A12 gene. BGT-1 is predominantly expressed in the liver (hepatocytes). It is also expressed in the kidney where it is regulated by NFAT5 during a response to osmotic stress. Further, BGT1 is also present in the leptomeninges surrounding the brain. Deletion of the BGT1 gene in mice did not appear to have any impact on the tendency to develop epilepsy. This is to be expected considering that BGT1 is expressed at far lower levels than GAT1 and also has lower affinity for GABA. This implies that it is not likely to contribute significantly to the inactivation of the inhibitory neurotransmitter GABA.

See also 
 Solute carrier family

References 

Solute carrier family